Harry Thomas Gisborne (September 11, 1893 – November 9, 1949) was an American forester who pioneered the scientific study of wildfires.

Biography
Harry Gisborne was born in Montpelier, Vermont.  After graduating with a forestry degree from the University of Michigan, he joined the U.S. Forest Service, and after four years was assigned to head the Rocky Mountain Research Station in Missoula, Montana.  Many of his studies were conducted at the Priest River Experimental Forest, just outside Priest River, Idaho.  During his tenure there, he developed new instruments and methods to study the start and spread of wildfires. He was the first recipient from his area to receive the USDA Superior Service Award.

Gisborne died of a heart attack on November 9, 1949, while field-checking the site of the Mann Gulch Fire in August 1949. Norman Maclean called this the "death of a scientist" in his book Young Men and Fire.

References

External links
 U.S. Forest Service History: Harry Gisborne
"September 11, 1893: Forest Fire Researcher Harry Gisborne’s Birthday". Peeling Back the Bark, the Forest History Society.
  The Gisborne Era of Forest Fire Research 
 Harry Thomas Gisborne Papers (University of Montana Archives)

Forestry academics
1893 births
1949 deaths
American foresters
University of Michigan School of Natural Resources and Environment alumni